Selenium tetrabromide is an inorganic compound with a chemical formula SeBr4.

Preparation 
Selenium tetrabromide could be produced by mixing elemental bromine and selenium:

Properties 
Selenium tetrabromide exists in two polymorphs, the trigonal, black α-SeBr4 and the monoclinic, orange-reddish β-SeBr4, both of which feature tetrameric cubane-like Se4Br16 units but differ in how they are arranged. It dissolves in carbon disulfide, chloroform and ethyl bromide, but decomposes in water, so that it produces selenous acid in wet air. 

The compound is only stable under a bromine-saturated atmosphere; gas phase measurements of the gas density indicate that the compound decomposes into selenium monobromide and bromine.

References

Selenium(IV) compounds
Bromides